Lizard Lick Towing is an American reality television show that originated as a spin-off of the series All Worked Up and ran for four seasons on truTV from February 7, 2011, to August 18, 2014. The show follows Ron and Amy Shirley, Bobby Brantley, and their team of repossession agents in Lizard Lick, North Carolina, the an unincorporated area near the Raleigh suburb of Wendell.

History
Lizard Lick Towing and Recovery is a local towing and recovery company owned and operated by Lizard Lick resident Ronnie Shirley and his wife Amy Shirley.

Ron Shirley started Lizard Lick Towing in 1998 with a single truck, along with his wife Amy Shirley. In 10 years, the company grew to 15 staff members and a fleet of 20 trucks. Bobby Brantley is Ron's friend and longtime co-worker, who started out as a dissatisfied customer after Ron towed his truck, then began working at Lizard Lick to pay off his debt.

Ron and Amy originally were going to be part of Wife Swap.

According to the local Eastern Wake News, the television series got its start at the end of August 2008, when the station sent a cameraman down for one day of shooting and that was all it took for a contract to be written. Those at the network were merely scouting out prospects at the time, but after realizing Amy Shirley was not only a powerlifter, but a mortician and co-owner of the recovery business, they realized there was more color to the picture than originally anticipated. Robyn Hutt, the truTV executive in charge of the show, was quoted by the Raleigh News and Observer "We really fell in love with Lizard Lick". The Shirleys are "dynamic and entertaining characters".

The first television series following Ronnie and his company operations was All Worked Up. TruTV later developed a new show solely dedicated to the Shirleys. The show premiered on February 7, 2011. The second season debuted on December 5, 2011. The third season premiered on January 21, 2013. The fourth season premiered on December 16, 2013. The series was canceled at the end of the fourth season.

On February 17, 2022, Ron Shirley's son Alex Harley was shot and killed outside a home in Garner, North Carolina. Authorities in Johnston County subsequently arrested two teenagers for the shooting of Alex Harley Shirley and his female companion, Sophie Hagy.

Cast
This is a list of the main cast members and guest stars who have appeared and are currently appearing on Lizard Lick Towing & Lick Life.

Key
  = Main Cast
  = Recurring cast member (cast member appears in two or more episodes in that series)
  = Guest starring (cast member appears in only one episode in that series)

 Ronnie Lee Shirley, Jr.: Owner of Lizard Lick Towing and Recovery/Repo Man
 Amy Jane Shirley (née Vaughn): Vice President of Lizard Lick Towing
 Big Juicy: Driver and office worker; her "real" name is Diane
 Bobby Brantley: Ron's Employee
 "Krazy Dave" Eckler: Shop Mechanic,  called "KD"
 Cassie: Bobby's on and off girlfriend
 Johnny Reynolds: Ronnie's cousin
 Lou: Employee
 Earl: Repo man
 Grace: Office employee
 Henry Cousins: Security guard

Series overview

During the course of the original series, 91 episodes have aired.

References

2010s American reality television series
2011 American television series debuts
2014 American television series debuts
English-language television shows
Television shows filmed in North Carolina
Television shows set in North Carolina
Television series by Banijay
TruTV original programming
American television spin-offs
Reality television spin-offs